Florent Sauvadet (born 31 January 1989) is a French footballer who plays as forward for FC Fleury 91.

Honours
Petrolul Ploieşti 
Romanian Cup (1): 2012–13

References

External links
 
 

1989 births
Living people
People from Issoire
French footballers
Association football forwards
Ligue 2 players
Liga I players
Championnat National 2 players
Clermont Foot players
FC Petrolul Ploiești players
FC Universitatea Cluj players
Moulins Yzeure Foot players
FC Annecy players
FC Fleury 91 players
Sportspeople from Puy-de-Dôme
Expatriate footballers in Romania
French expatriate sportspeople in Romania
Footballers from Auvergne-Rhône-Alpes